Barry Elliot might refer to:

Barry Elliott (entertainer), member of the Chuckle Brothers
Barry Elliot (footballer), English former footballer